Phenomena (sing. phenomenon) are observable events.

Phenomena or phenomenon may also refer to:

Science 
 Electrical phenomena
 List of geological phenomena
 Optical phenomena
 Social phenomenon

Film 
 Phenomena (film), a 1985 horror film by Italian director Dario Argento starring Jennifer Connelly
 Phenomenon (film), a 1996 film starring John Travolta and Forest Whitaker
 Phenomenon II, a 2003 made-for-television remake of the 1996 film
 The Phenomenon (2020 film), a documentary on UFOs by James Fox

People
Ronaldo (Brazilian footballer) (b. 1976), association football player known as "The Phenomenon"

Television 
 Phenomenon (TV program), a 2007 American reality television program that aired on NBC
 "The Phenomenon" (Smash), a 2013 episode of the American television series Smash

Music 
 Phänomene, a waltz composed by Johann Strauss II
 Phenomena (band), a multi-media rock music concept originated by Tom Galley and masterminded by Wilfried F. Rimensberger
 Phenomena (Planetshakers album), 2002
 "Phenomena" (song), a 2006 song by the Yeah Yeah Yeahs
Phenomena (Audiomachine album), 2014
 Phenomenon (UFO album), 1974
 Phenomenon (LL Cool J album), 1997
 "Phenomenon" (LL Cool J song)
 Phenomenon (Thousand Foot Krutch album), 2003
"Phenomenon" (Thousand Foot Krutch song)
 Phenomenon (Monsta X album), 2019
 "Phenomenon", a song by The Black Eyed Peas from The Beginning
 "Phenomenon", a song by Limp Bizkit on their 2003 album Results May Vary
 "Phenomenon", a song by TobyMac from Welcome to Diverse City
 Phenomena (Within the Ruins album), 2014
 The Phenomenon 1968–1998, a 1998 greatest hits album by Demis Roussos

Other uses
 Phenomena, a poem by the Greek poet Aratus
 Phenomena (Amiga demogroup), the name of a Demogroup producing Amiga demos
 Phaenomena Aratea (disambiguation)